Sir Robin John Christian Millar  (born 18 December 1951) is an English record producer, musician and businessman, known variously as 'The Original Smooth Operator', 'The man behind Sade', and 'Golden Ears' Boy George. He was born in London to an Irish father and West Indian mother, and is blind. He is one of the world's most successful record producers with over 150 gold, silver and platinum discs and 55 million record sales to his credit. His 1984 production of Diamond Life, the debut album by Sade, was named one of the best ten albums of the last 30 years at the 2011 Brit Awards.

He has developed and run a string of businesses in car hire, music recording and publishing and is currently Executive Group Chairman of the Blue Raincoat Chrysalis Group.

He has worked as a fundraiser for vulnerable people for 30 years and in 2012 underwent a 12-hour operation to install a bionic retina in his right eye to help research into future treatment for blindness.

He was appointed Commander of the Order of the British Empire (CBE) in the 2010 Birthday Honours and knighted in the 2023 New Year Honours for services to music, people with disabilities, young people and charity.

In November 2020 he was appointed Chair of Scope UK, the national charity representing 14 million UK disabled people. In February 2021 he rode 407 virtual miles on an exercise bike to raise £40,000 for Scope, whose shops were closed down in the pandemic.

Early life
Millar was born with retinitis pigmentosa at St George's Hospital, which is now The Lanesborough Hotel, Hyde Park Corner. Despite poor vision he attended mainstream state school Enfield Grammar School from 1963 to 1970 and then read law at Queens' College, Cambridge from 1970 to 1973.

Musical career
After gaining his law degree, Millar moved into the music industry initially as a guitarist and artist in a band called The Blue Max alongside Danny Peyronel with Charisma Records, eventually putting out records with Atlantic and WEA and working with ex-Velvet Underground singer Nico. After working with post punk band Weekend as a record producer in 1982, he purchased Morgan Studios studio 1 and studio 2 to found Power Plant Studios in 1984. Millar's breakthrough came in 1984 with seven consecutive Top 10 albums; including Eden by Everything but the Girl, Working Nights by Working Week, and multi-platinum selling Diamond Life, the debut album by the band Sade.

Production on other significant hit records in the period include Fine Young Cannibals (Fine Young Cannibals), Colin Hay (Looking for Jack), Big Country (The Seer), Patricia Kaas (Je te dis vous), Kane Gang, Bhundu Boys and Randy Crawford amongst others. Millar arranged the music for the film, And Now... Ladies and Gentlemen... Millar's song "Rich and Poor", co-composed with Colin Vearncombe, was recorded by Randy Crawford on her 1989 album, Rich and Poor. His 2003 solo album, Kiss and Tell was released by the Nujaz record label.

Millar trained as a recording engineer, classical and jazz musician and arranger, and has trained dozens of engineers and producers, including Jim Abbiss, the producer of Arctic Monkeys and Adele.

In 2005, he produced MP4's EP album "House Music" which included a version of The Beatles', "Can't Buy Me Love". In 2010 he produced the 12 track MP4 album "Cross Party". In 2016 he brought together MPs, professional musicians, students and the Thurrock Community Chorus for a charity recording of "You can't always get what you want" in aid of the Friends of Jo Cox MP.

Millar is a patron of The Music Producers Guild, which he helped found in 1987.

Millar was executive producer of the major worldwide series of concerts to commemorate the 50th anniversary of the death of Édith Piaf, with shows in Carnegie Hall, New York, The Royal Albert Hall London and major venues in France, Germany, Russia, Europe and the Far East. He has been collaborating with Australian singer/songwriter Eran James whom he met through Elton John in 2010.

He is currently Chairman of Chrysalis Records Ltd and Blue Raincoat Music, who handle the careers of Cigarettes After Sex and Phoebe Bridgers and the music recordings of Ultravox, Sinead O’Connor, The Specials, Debbie Harry, Billy Idol's Generation X and Everything But The Girl and a song catalogue that includes "The Best" global hit sung by Tina Turner and music from the original Woodstock Festival.

Charity work promoting skills and training
In July 2017 Millar became a founder trustee of the Institute for Apprenticeships and Technical Education. He was a founder trustee of the National Skills Academy for Creative & Cultural from 2008 to 2011 and was instrumental in the project to build The Backstage Centre, part of High House Purfleet. Co-located with the Royal Opera House's Bob and Tamar Manoukian Production Centre, the centre hires out its Sound Stage and recording studios to professional companies whilst hosting training courses for young people in backstage skills. In 2016 Millar led a charity recording from the Centre involving MPs, the local choir and professional singers to raise funds in memory of MP Jo Cox. From 2011 to 2015 Millar was a trustee of Creative & Cultural Skills. In 2020 he was appointed chair of the disability charity Scope (charity). He has produced music events for charity including when a Patron at UNHCR and was a global ambassador for Leonard Cheshire Disability for eight years.

Personal life
He was married to American painter Ellen Trillas from 1979 to 1997. They had two children. He has been with his partner and long time friend Shelley Davies for twenty years.

Millar appeared on BBC Radio 4's Desert Island Discs on 20 March 2015.

Production credits
In addition to those listed above, Millar's work as a record producer includes credits on the following:
Promise – Sade
Hope and Glory – Tom Robinson Band
Wonderful Life, Black – Black
Nouveau Monde – 
Paris – Malcolm McLaren
Mickey Hart's Mystery Box – Mickey Hart
Urban World Music – Hiroshima
House Music – MP4
Cross Party – MP4
Singles Collection – The Bluebells
In T.R.O.U.B.L.E. Again – Vic Godard
Ive Mendes – Ive Mendes
Sound of the Style Council – The Style Council
Sungrooves – Mark Riva
In The House – Dimitri from Paris
Shev and the Brakes – Shev and the Brakes
To Touch You – Tyrone Berkeley
"My Favourite Town" – POLA

References

External links
 Official website
 Robin's appearance on BBC Radio 4's Desert Island Discs

1951 births
Living people
English record producers
English songwriters
English rock musicians
People from the City of Westminster
Knights Bachelor
Musicians awarded knighthoods
Commanders of the Order of the British Empire
People educated at Enfield Grammar School
Alumni of Queens' College, Cambridge
English people of Irish descent
English people of West Indian descent